Milica Vukliš  (born 18 June 1993 in Belgrade, Serbia) is a Serbian model who was named Miss Serbia for 2013/2014  and represented  Serbia in the Miss World 2014 contest in London. 
At Miss World 2014 she won 4th place in Sports & Fitness challenge event and place in top 27 in Beauty With a Purpose.

References

1993 births
Living people
Models from Belgrade
Serbian female models
Miss Serbia winners
Miss World 2014 delegates
Serbian beauty pageant winners
Serbian women